Mahipal Shastri or Mahipal Singh Shastri Yadav (19 January 1924 – 23 August 1994) was an Indian politician who served as Governor of the state of Gujarat during 1990. He died in Lucknow on 23 August 1994, at the age of 70.

References

1924 births
1994 deaths
Leaders of the Opposition in the Uttar Pradesh Legislative Council